Baule is a commune in the Loiret department in north-central France. The writer Michèle Desbordes (1940–2006) died in Baule.

Population

See also
 Communes of the Loiret department

References

External links

 Official site

Communes of Loiret